Kilpauk Medical College Metro station is a Metro railway station on Line 2 of the Chennai Metro. The station is among the underground stations coming up along corridor II of the Chennai Metro, Chennai Central–St. Thomas Mount stretch inaugurated on 14 May 2017. The station will serve the neighbourhoods of Kilpauk and Chetput.

History

Construction
The Chennai Metro Rail project took 2,756 square meters of land from the Kilpauk Medical College for the construction of the Metro station.

The station
The station has four entry and exit points.

Structure
Kilpauk Medical College is underground Metro station situated on Green Line (Chennai Metro).

Station layout

Facilities
List of available ATM at Kilpauk Medical College metro station are

Connections

Bus
Metropolitan Transport Corporation (Chennai) bus routes number 15, 15B, 15C, 15D, 15F, 15FCT, 15G, 27B, 27C, 29B, 29C, 29N, 37D, 37G, 40, 40A, 50, 53A, 53B, 53E, 53P, 54V, 56G, 59, 59A, 71C, 71D, 71E, 71F, 71H, 71V, 101, 101NS, 127B, 129C, 150, 153, 159, 159A, 159ANS, 159B, 159D, 159E, 159F, 159K, 553, 571, B29NGS, J29C, M15LCT, M29B, M29C, M54V, serves the station from nearby K.M.C Hospital bus stand.

Rail
Chetput railway station

Entry/Exit

See also

 Chennai
 Chetput (Chennai)
 Chetput Lake
 List of Chennai metro stations
 Chennai Metro
 Railway stations in Chennai
 Chennai Mass Rapid Transit System
 Chennai Monorail
 Chennai Suburban Railway
 Chetput railway station
 Transport in Chennai
 Urban rail transit in India
 List of metro systems

References

External links
 

 UrbanRail.Net – descriptions of all metro systems in the world, each with a schematic map showing all stations.

Chennai Metro stations
Railway stations in Chennai